The 1989 Trofeo Repsol was the third round of the 1989 World Sportscar Championship season. It took place at the Circuito Permanente Del Jarama, Spain on June 25, 1989.

Due to a limited number of garages at Jarama this round was not mandatory, even though points were still awarded for the overall championships.  Several top teams choosing not to attend include Richard Lloyd, Joest, Aston Martin, and Mazdaspeed.

Official results
Class winners in bold.  Cars failing to complete 75% of winner's distance marked as Not Classified (NC).

Statistics
 Pole position - #61 Team Sauber Mercedes - 1:15.580
 Fastest lap - #61 Team Sauber Mercedes - 1:20.970
 Average speed - 139.720 km/h

References

 
 

Jarama
Jarama
1000 km Jarama